Torkabad (also Romanized as Torkābād and Tarkābād; also known as Turkābād) is a village in Mohammadiyeh Rural District of the Central District of Ardakan County, Yazd province, Iran. At the 2006 National Census, its population was 2,656 in 686 households. The following census in 2011 counted 3,194 people in 947 households. The latest census in 2016 showed a population of 3,714 people in 1,138 households; it was the largest village in its rural district.

References 

Ardakan County

Populated places in Yazd Province

Populated places in Ardakan County